Aloys Thomas Raimund, Count Harrach (7 March 1669, Vienna – 7 November, 1742, Vienna) was an Austrian politician and diplomat.

Biography 
His father was Ferdinand Bonaventura I. He belonged to the Austrian noble family of Harrach.

Aloys von Harrach was the envoy of the Austrian Emperor in Dresden in 1694, served in the same function in Spain from 1697 to 1700 and was in Dresden again in 1711, and thereafter in Berlin and Hanover on diplomatic missions. From 1715 to 1742 he acted as 'Landmarschall' in Lower Austria, and from 1728 to 1733 as viceroy of Naples, from where he gathered numerous art pieces (Gallery in Rohrau). From 1734 to his death Count Harrach was a member of the Secret State Conference (Geheime Staatskonferenz) in Vienna.

The Count was first married to Marie Barbara von Sternberg on 22 April  1691, and then to Countess Anna Caecilie von Thannhausen on 22 August 1695.

His oldest son, Count Friedrich August von Harrach-Rohrau was interim governor of the Austrian Netherlands, and his youngest son Ferdinand Bonaventura II von Harrach, governor of the Duchy of Milan. Another son, Wenzel Leopold, was killed in the Battle of San Pietro in 1734.

External links 

 Worldroots

1669 births
1742 deaths
17th-century Austrian people
18th-century Austrian people
Diplomats from Vienna
Counts of Austria
Nobility from Vienna